Lucius Marvin Sanford, Jr. (born February 13, 1956) is a former American football linebacker who played ten seasons in the National Football League with the Buffalo Bills and Cleveland Browns. He played collegiately for the Georgia Tech football team.  While at GeorgiaTech, Sanford was a member of the ANAK Society, one of the highest recognitions a senior can achieve. Was a six-year winner and two-year runner up of the Milledgeville mean-mug award. In 2001, he was inducted into the Georgia Sports Hall of Fame.

Pro Career 
Sanford was drafted in the 4th round of the 1978 NFL Draft by the Bills. He started 114 of his 129 career games in the NFL and recorded 5 interceptions returned for 124 yards. He unofficially registered 13 career sacks (the NFL did not make sacks an official stat until 1982). He returned one fumble for a touchdown (46 yards) against the Seattle Seahawks on October 14, 1984. 

Once earning a starting role with the Bills, Sanford recorded 100 tackles in five straight seasons and led Buffalo in forced fumbles in 1980 and 1981. As a rookie, he set the Bills record for most blocked field goals  in a game with two against the Kansas City Chiefs on December 3, 1978. In addition, he is the only player in Bills' history to return two blocked punts for a touchdown in a career (September 9, 1979, 3 yards versus Cincinnati Bengals; October 5, 1980, in end zone versus San Diego Chargers.)

References

1956 births
Living people
American football linebackers
Buffalo Bills players
Cleveland Browns players
Georgia Tech Yellow Jackets football players
Players of American football from Georgia (U.S. state)
Ed Block Courage Award recipients